Dalit Mazdoor Kisan Party (Dalit Worker Peasant Party) is an Indian political party founded in 1984 by the remains of the Lok Dal. The DMKP was mainly based in Uttar Pradesh. It was led by former Prime Minister Charan Singh. It was founded on 21 October 1984. It was merger of Charan Singh's Lok Dal, Democratic Socialist Party of Hemwati Nandan Bahuguna, Rashtriya Congress of Ratubhai Adani and some members of Janata Party like Devi Lal. Later it changed its name to the Lok Dal.

In 1984 Lok Sabha election, DMKP contested on 168 seats and won 3 seats.

Prominent members 

 Charan Singh, founder of Dalit Mazdoor Kisan Party.

 Hemwati Nandan Bahuguna, was president of campaign committee for 1984 general election.
 Karpoori Thakur.
 Devi Lal.
 Mulayam Singh Yadav, was Uttar Pradesh president of party unit.
 Phagu Chauhan.
 Kumbha Ram Arya.
 Savita Ambedkar, was DMKP's candidate for Raebareli Lok Sabha constituency.

References

 

Defunct political parties in India
Political parties established in 1984
1984 establishments in Uttar Pradesh
Agrarian parties in India
Political parties with year of disestablishment missing
Bharatiya Lok Dal